Křenovy is a municipality and village in Domažlice District in the Plzeň Region of the Czech Republic. It has about 100 inhabitants.

History
The first written mention of Křenovy is from 1379.

References

Villages in Domažlice District